New and Old Gospel is an album by American saxophonist Jackie McLean recorded in 1967 and released on the Blue Note label. It features McLean in a quintet with saxophonist Ornette Coleman (here on trumpet), pianist LaMont Johnson, bassist Scotty Holt and drummer Billy Higgins.

Reception
The AllMusic review by Thom Jurek stated: "This is one legendary Blue Note date that isn't mentioned often enough in that label's great history".

Track listing
 "Lifeline Medley: Offering/Midway/Vernzone/The Inevitable End" (McLean) - 21:40
 "Old Gospel" (Ornette Coleman) - 10:42
 "Strange as It Seems" (Coleman) - 9:10

Personnel
Jackie McLean - alto saxophone
Ornette Coleman - trumpet
LaMont Johnson - piano
Scotty Holt - bass
Billy Higgins - drums

References

Blue Note Records albums
Jackie McLean albums
1968 albums
Albums recorded at Van Gelder Studio
Albums produced by Alfred Lion